Malacothamnus fremontii is a species of flowering plant in the mallow family known by the common name Frémont's bushmallow (after John C. Frémont).

Distribution
Malacothamnus fremontii is endemic to California, where it has a scattered distribution in various regions of the state. It is found growing in chaparral and woodlands in several mountain ranges and their foothills, and higher altitude forests on Mojave Desert sky islands.

Description
Malacothamnus fremontii is a stiff, erect shrub with a branching stem reaching  in height. It is coated densely in white fibers, appearing feltlike. The hairy oval or rounded lobed leaves are several centimeters long. The inflorescence is an elongated cluster of many pale purple flowers with hairy petals each up to a centimeter long.

External links
Jepson Manual Treatment: Malacothamnus fremontii
USDA Plants Profile: Malacothamnus fremontii (Frémont's bushmallow)
Malacothamnus fremontii — U.C. Photo gallery

fremontii
Endemic flora of California
Flora of the California desert regions
Flora of the Sierra Nevada (United States)
Natural history of the California chaparral and woodlands
Natural history of the California Coast Ranges
Natural history of the Mojave Desert
Natural history of the Peninsular Ranges
Natural history of the San Francisco Bay Area
Natural history of the Santa Monica Mountains
Natural history of the Transverse Ranges
John C. Frémont
Taxa named by Asa Gray
Taxa named by John Torrey
Taxa named by Edward Lee Greene
Flora without expected TNC conservation status